Hibernaspidoidei is a taxon of extinct amphiaspidid heterostracan agnathans whose fossils are restricted to Lower Devonian marine strata of Siberia near the Taimyr Peninsula.  In life, hibernaspid amphiaspidids are thought to be benthic animals that lived most of their lives mostly buried in the sediment of a series of hypersaline lagoons. All amphiaspids are easily distinguished from other heterostracans in that all of the plates of the cephalothorax armor are fused into a single, muff-like unit, so that the forebody of the living animal would have looked like a potpie or a hot waterbottle with  a pair of small, or degenerated eyes, a pair of branchial openings for exhaling, and, in the case of hibernaspids, a simple, slit-like mouth at the anterior end of a tube-like head.

Taxonomy
Hibernaspidoidei contains three families.

Hibernaspididae 
This family is monotypic, containing only the genus Hibernaspis.

Eglonaspididae 
This is a diverse family that contains five monotypic genera, including Eglonaspis, Gerronaspis, Lecaniaspis, Empedaspis, and Pelurgaspis.

Aphataspididae 
This family contains two monotypic genera, Aphataspis and Putoranaspis.

References

Amphiaspidida
Devonian jawless fish
Prehistoric animal superfamilies
Vertebrate superfamilies
Early Devonian fish
Fauna of Siberia
Fossils of Russia
Early Devonian first appearances
Devonian extinctions